Symphyotrichum lentum (formerly Aster lentus) is a species of flowering plant in the family Asteraceae with the common name of Suisun Marsh aster. It is a perennial and herbaceous plant endemic to the marshes of Sacramento-San Joaquin River Delta of Northern California.

Description
Symphyotrichum lentum is similar in appearance to Symphyotrichum chilense, which may be found in the same area. The lower leaves wither by the time the plant flowers. The inflorescence is an open array of flower heads with a fringe of violet ray florets around a center of yellow disc florets. The fruit is a hairy cypsela with a long white pappus.

Distribution and habitat
Symphyotrichum lentum is endemic to the salt marshes and wet grasslands of the Sacramento–San Joaquin River Delta in Northern California.

Conservation
NatureServe lists it as Imperiled (G2) worldwide.

Citations

References

External links
.
.
Aster lentus protologue in Manual of the Botany of the Region of San Francisco Bay by Edward Lee Greene.
Symphyotrichum lentum datasheet from the Centre for Agriculture and Bioscience International (CABI) Invasive Species Compendium.

lentum
Endemic flora of California
Natural history of Solano County, California
Plants described in 1894
Taxa named by Edward Lee Greene